The Namaqualand is an arid region of Namibia and South Africa.

Namaqualand may also refer to:

 Namaqualand Daisy
 Namaqualand Daisies, a South Africa field hockey club
 Namaqualand Railway

Locomotives 
 Namaqualand 0-4-0WT Condenser
 Namaqualand 0-4-2IST Caledonia
 Namaqualand 0-4-2ST Pioneer
 Namaqualand 0-4-2T Britannia
 Namaqualand 0-6-0T 1871
 Namaqualand 0-6-2 Clara Class
 Namaqualand 0-6-2 Scotia Class

See also
 Namaqua (disambiguation)